Tarzan's Quest is a novel by American writer Edgar Rice Burroughs, the nineteenth in his series of twenty-four books about the title character Tarzan.  Originally serialized in six parts, as Tarzan and the Immortal Men, in The Blue Book Magazine, from October 1935 to March 1936; the first collected edition was published as the 1936 novel Tarzan’s Quest by Burroughs’ own publishing company.

Plot
Tarzan's wife Jane (her first appearance since Tarzan and the Ant Men and also her last as a major character in the series),  becomes involved in a search for a bloodthirsty lost tribe reputed to possess an immortality drug. Also drawn in are Tarzan and his monkey companion, little Nkima, and Chief Muviro and his faithful Waziri warriors, who are searching for Muviro's lost daughter Buira. Nkima's vital contribution to the adventure is recognized when he is made a recipient of the immortality treatment along with the human protagonists at the end of the novel.

Comic adaptations
The book has been adapted into comic form by Gold Key Comics in Tarzan nos. 188–189, dated October–December 1969.

Sources

External links
 
 ERBzine.com Illustrated Bibliography entry for Edgar Rice Burroughs' Tarzan's Quest
Edgar Rice Burroughs Summary Project page for Tarzan's Quest
Text of the novel at Project Gutenberg Australia 

1936 American novels
1936 fantasy novels
Tarzan novels by Edgar Rice Burroughs
Fiction about immortality